|}

The Clarence House Chase is a Grade 1 National Hunt steeplechase in Great Britain which is open to horses aged five years or older. It is run at Ascot over a distance of about 2 miles and 1 furlong (2 miles and 167 yards, or 3,371 metres), and during its running there are thirteen fences to be jumped. The race is scheduled to take place each year in January.

The event was sponsored from its inauguration to 2013 by the bookmaker Victor Chandler. It was registered as the Clarence House Chase, but it was usually referred to by its sponsored title. In 2014 the race reverted to its registered title and the sponsorship was taken over by Sodexo. In 2018 it was sponsored by Royal Salute Whisy and since 2019 Matchbook betting exchange have sponsored the race.

The first running was planned to have taken place in 1987. However, it was abandoned that year due to frost, and also the following year because of fog. Originally it was a handicap race, and its distance was set at 2 miles (3,219 metres). In 2005 and 2006, while its usual home was closed for redevelopment, the event was temporarily switched to alternative venues. Upon returning to Ascot the race's regular distance was extended by a furlong. In 2007 it was promoted to Grade 1 status, and it ceased to be run as a handicap.

The race often includes some of the leading contenders for the Queen Mother Champion Chase. Seven horses have won both races in the same season – Viking Flagship (1994), Call Equiname (1999), Master Minded (2009), Sprinter Sacre (2013), Sire de Grugy (2014), Dodging Bullets (2015) and Altior (2019).

Records
Most successful horse (3 wins):
 Un de Sceaux – 2016, 2017, 2018

Leading jockey (4 wins):
 Ruby Walsh – Master Minded (2009), Twist Magic (2010) Un de Sceaux (2016, 2017)

Leading trainer (6 wins):

 Nicky Henderson - Big Matt (1996), Isio (2004), Tysou (2006), Sprinter Sacre (2013), Altior (2019), Shishkin (2022)

Winners
As a handicap race
 Weights given in stones and pounds.

As a conditions race

See also
 Horse racing in Great Britain
 List of British National Hunt races

References
 Racing Post:

 pedigreequery.com – Victor Chandler (Clarence House) Chase – Ascot.

External links
 Race Recordings 1989–2004 

National Hunt races in Great Britain
Ascot Racecourse
National Hunt chases